Evangeline Rose Gil Eigenmann (June 21, 1963 – August 5, 2022), known professionally as Cherie Gil, was a Filipino actress. With a career spanning nearly 50 years, she was dubbed the "La Primera Contravida" ("The Prime Villain") for her acting prowess which landed her numerous antagonistic roles on film, television, and even on stage. 

Gil was a FAMAS Award winner, a recipient of Ani ng Dangal by the National Commission for Culture and the Arts and a Hall of Famer at the Metro Manila Film Festival in the Best Supporting Actress category. In 2015, she won the Best Actress trophy at the ASEAN International Film Awards. The same year, she also won the Best Lead Actress in a Foreign Language Film at the 2015 Madrid International Film Festival. In 2019, she was awarded the Best Supporting Actress at the 42nd Gawad Urian Awards for her portrayal of the character Patricia Medina in the feature film Citizen Jake.

She began her career as a child actress at the age of 9, and was best known for her role as Lavinia Arguelles in Bituing Walang Ningning (1985) where she uttered the iconic line "You're nothing but a second-rate, trying hard copycat!" to Dorina Pineda, Sharon Cuneta's character.

She is a well known celebrity A Lister away from her film projects as the anti heroine she has done TV soaps as an antagonist or main cast (May Bukas Pa) for Viva Television Bituin and Sa Puso Ko Iingatan Ka (2002-2003) for ABS-CBN In 2009 she had played a big role in the show Katorse as a nice mother in law. In 2012 the show Legacy she returned as a main antagonist.  In 2013 she was cast in the hit series Muling Buksan Ang Puso.

Early life
Cherie Gil was born on June 21, 1963 as Evangeline Rose Gil Eigenmann to a family of actors. Her parents were Eddie Mesa and Rosemarie Gil. She had two brothers, Michael de Mesa and Mark Gil (1961–2014), both actors, and a half-sister, Elaine Eigenmann.

Career
Gil started in showbiz at an early age being the daughter of celebrities and sibling of equally-talented actors. She was cast either as a daughter or part of a circle of friends of the lead actor. However, she was given a lead star status in Bubot na Bayabas in 1978 opposite another newbie, Ronald Bregendahl (Rita Gomez and Ric Rodrigo's son). The movie was a forgettable release. But in 1979, film matriarch Lily Monteverde re-launched her via Problem Child with the then-current teen sensation, Lloyd Samartino. The movie fared mildly, and she was continually cast by Regal Films in films such as City After Dark, Salawahan, Ito Ba Ang Ating Mga Anak and Sugar Daddy. She went freelance with assignments like "Beach House", "Ang Bouncer at ang Dancer", "Dancing Master", "Girlfriend" among others. In 1982, Gil portrayed a naïve lass affected by World War II in Bacolod in the now classic film Oro, Plata, Mata. She tried singing and had another mild hit, "I Love You, Boy". On TV, she was one of the co-hosts of German Moreno in Germspesyal from 1979 to 1981. Gil became a mainstay of Champoy with Subas Herrero and Noel Trinidad from 1981 to 1986.

Gil resurfaced as a villain in 1985 via Viva Films' Bituing Walang Ningning, providing the lead actress Sharon Cuneta formidable support in the role of Lavinia Arguelles, a famous but insecure singer. From this movie, she became famous for her iconic line, "You're nothing but a second rate, trying hard copycat!" This favorable reception consequently opened her for classy and sultry villainess roles, throughout the 1980s until the present.

She appeared in a number of hit teleseryes and primetime shows on ABS-CBN and GMA Network. Starred in numerous films, TV and has performed in theatre for play such as Master Class playing Maria Callas (PETA) Arbol de Fuego, an adaptation of Anton Chekov's The Cherry Orchard and Full Gallop as Diana Vreeland, bestowing her the Best Actress award for her one-woman portrayal in 2014.

In 2000–2001, she starred in her first soap May Bukas Pa that aired on PTV-4 as part of Viva Entertainment TVs block timer and in 2002–2003 on ABS-CBN's Bituin, where she resumed her vocal talents and in 2004 TV series, Marina. In 2006, she took on the role as Menang Medel in the hit TV remake of Gulong Ng Palad.

In 2010, she was chosen to star in the fantasy series Grazilda on GMA Network. In early 2011, she joined the cast of the comedy fantasy series, Magic Palayok co-starred by Carla Abellana, and Geoff Eigenmann. The series did not get picked up for a second season after the season 1 finale which is composed of 88 episodes. The GMA Network cast her in another television show, Time of My Life.

Gil was part of 83 awardees of the Ani ng Dangal award by the National Commission for Culture and the Arts (NCCA), represented the cinema category on February 29, 2016. This, for simultaneously winning the Best Actress award at The ASEAN Film Festival for her role in Sonata and Best Actress in a foreign film at The Madrid Film festival for her portrayal in MANA, both in the same year.

Her last acting role would be in the GMA Network 2021 television series Legal Wives. In May 2021, she announced that she had left her role in an unspecified television series, lamenting on how her efforts were not "seen and met in the same light".

Later life and death
In October 2021, Gil was diagnosed with a "rare" form of endometrial cancer, and she chose to conceal information on her illness to the public. Gil's showbiz career ended in February 2022 when she moved to the United States to be with her children and prioritize her own "mental, emotional, [and] spiritual states". She also shaved her head to symbolize her own "personal growth". Gil died on August 5, 2022, at 4:48 a.m. EDT (4:48 p.m. PHT) from her cancer in New York City. Prior to her death, she had been receiving treatment at the Memorial Sloan Kettering Cancer Center in New York.

Personal life
She was married to Rony Rogoff, an Israeli violinist; the couple had a daughter and a son. Their relationship ended in 2008 after 20 years of marriage. She also had another son, her eldest, from a previous relationship with actor Leo Martinez. Shortly after their separation, Gil's two children with Rogoff would be under their father's custody in Israel while Gil's eldest son would remain with her in the Philippines. All three children would eventually reside in the United States. Gil reportedly reconciled with ex-husband Rogoff in 2021 with both deciding to be "companions" to each other.

Filmography

Film

Television

Theatre

Awards and nominations

References

External links

"Tomorrow is Always a Day Away", Manila Standard; accessed September 4, 2014.
"Truth and beauty in ‘Master Class’", The Philippine Inquirer; accessed September 4, 2014.
"Underrated and under-utilized actors we should see more often", The Philippine Inquirer; accessed September 4, 2014.
"After you Cherie!", Philippine Headline News; accessed September 4, 2014.
Studio Whispers:  Cherie,  Dawn Get Husbands' Nod To Return To Showbiz, Philippine Headline News; accessed September 4, 2014.
"Nescafé Gold Spot Awards: Seeking the top culinary destinations" – Philippine Star
"Cherie Gil goes onstage via Doubt", SunStar.com; accessed September 4, 2014.

1963 births
2022 deaths
ABS-CBN personalities
Actresses from Manila
Deaths from cancer in New York (state)
Deaths from endometrial cancer
Cherie
Filipino expatriates in the United States
Filipino film actresses
Filipino stage actresses
Filipino people of Kapampangan descent
Filipino people of German descent
Filipino people of Spanish descent
Filipino people of Swiss descent
Filipino television actresses
Filipino women comedians
GMA Network personalities
People of Swiss-German descent